Andre de Jong (born 2 November 1996) is a New Zealand professional footballer who plays as a forward for Stellenbosch F.C.. He is the son of former New Zealand striker, Fred de Jong.

International career

International goals
Scores and results list New Zealand's goal tally first.

References

External links
 

1996 births
Living people
New Zealand association footballers
Association football forwards
National Premier Leagues players
Eastern Suburbs AFC players
New Zealand Football Championship players
New Zealand expatriate association footballers
New Zealand expatriate sportspeople in South Africa
Expatriate soccer players in South Africa
South African Premier Division players
New Zealand international footballers
Wanderers Special Club players
Canterbury United players
Hakoah Sydney City East FC players
APIA Leichhardt FC players
AmaZulu F.C. players
Royal AM F.C. players